KUOI-FM (89.3 FM) is a freeform, college radio station in the western United States at the University of Idaho in Moscow, Idaho. It broadcasts in Moscow, the neighboring city Pullman, Washington, and in other townships on the Palouse. KUOI is headquartered in the third floor of the Student Union Building at Sixth and Deakin streets, on the northeast edge of campus.

The station began operating  in 1945, and began FM programming 23 years later in 1968, officially starting on Sunday, November 17.

Starting on the AM dial in 1945 at 655 kHz with a two-watt transmitter, it moved to 660 in 1947 at five watts; with the move to FM, it went to ten watts in 1968 at 89.3 MHz. It boosted up to fifty watts and stereo in 1977,  and to 400 watts in January 1995.

See also
KZUU – at Washington State University in Pullman

References

External links
KUOI-FM official website

UOI-FM
UOI-FM
University of Idaho
Mass media in Moscow, Idaho
Radio stations established in 1945
1945 establishments in Idaho